Karyna Dzmitryeuna Yarmolenka (born 4 May 2000) is a Belarusian group rhythmic gymnast. She is the 2021 World team and group all-around bronze medalist. She won a team silver medal at the 2021 European Championships. She is the 2019 European Games group all-around and 3 hoops + 4 clubs champion. She represented Belarus at the 2020 Summer Olympics where she finished fifth in the group all-around. At the junior level, she is the 2015 European 5 balls champion and group all-around silver medalist.

Career
Yarmolenka began rhythmic gymnastics in 2005.

Junior
At the 2015 Junior European Championships, Yarmolenka and the Belarusian junior group won the silver medal in the group all-around behind Russia. She then won a gold medal in the 5 balls event final.

Senior
Yarmolenka and the Belarusian group won the gold medal in the 5 balls final at the 2019 Sofia World Cup. She was selected to represent Belarus at the 2019 European Games alongside Hanna Haidukevich, Hanna Shvaiba, Arina Tsitsilina, Anastasiya Rybakova. They won the gold medal in the group all-around by 0.050 ahead of Bulgaria. They also won the gold medal in the 3 hoops + 4 clubs final. In the 5 balls final, they won the bronze medal behind Russia and Bulgaria. She then competed at the 2019 World Championships in Baku where the Belarusian group finished fourth in the all-around. They also finished fourth in the 3 hoops + 4 clubs final and seventh in the 5 balls final.

Yarmolenka competed at the 2021 Tashkent World Cup where the Belarusian group won the all-around bronze medal behind Uzbekistan and Israel. They won the silver medal in the 5 balls final behind Uzbekistan, and in the 3 hoops + 4 clubs behind Israel. She won a group all-around bronze medal at the 2021 Baku World Cup behind Bulgaria and Italy. They also won the bronze medal in the 3 hoops + 4 clubs final and placed fourth in the 5 balls. She then competed at the 2021 European Championships and won a silver medal in the team competition with the senior group and individuals Alina Harnasko and Anastasiia Salos. The Belarusian group finished fourth in the all-around and in 5 balls and finished eighth in 3 hoops + 4 clubs.

Yarmolenka was selected to represent Belarus at the 2020 Summer Olympics alongside Hanna Haidukevich, Anastasiya Malakanava, Arina Tsitsilina, Anastasiya Rybakova. In the qualification round, the group finished in eighth and qualified for the final spot in the final. Then in the group all-around final, the group improved to finish in fifth place. The same group then competed at the 2021 World Championships in Kitakyushu, Japan. They won the group all-around bronze medal behind Italy and Russia. This marked the first time Belarus won a World group all-around medal since 2014. In the apparatus finals, they finished fourth in 5 balls and eighth in 3 hoops + 4 clubs. The Belarusian team of Alina Harnasko, Anastasiia Salos, and the senior group won the team bronze medal behind Russia and Italy.

References

External links 
 
 

2000 births
Living people
Belarusian rhythmic gymnasts
Gymnasts from Minsk
Gymnasts at the 2019 European Games
European Games gold medalists for Belarus
European Games bronze medalists for Belarus
European Games medalists in gymnastics
Medalists at the Rhythmic Gymnastics European Championships
Medalists at the Rhythmic Gymnastics World Championships
Gymnasts at the 2020 Summer Olympics
Olympic gymnasts of Belarus
21st-century Belarusian women